Grande-Synthe is a commune in the Nord department in the Nord-Pas de Calais region in northern France.

It is the third-largest suburb of the city of Dunkerque (Dunkirk) and lies adjacent to it on the west.

History
In 1980, a large part of Petite-Synthe was detached from Dunkerque and included in Grande-Synthe.

Heraldry

Population

Politics

Presidential Elections 2nd Round

International relations

Grande-Synthe is twinned with:
 Suwałki in Poland

Personalities
Remy Vercoutre footballer
Lucas Pouille tennis player

Transport
Gare de Grande-Synthe railway station.

See also
Communes of the Nord department

References

External links

 Official website
 Grande-Synthe tourism website (in French, Dutch, and English)

Grandesynthe
Nord communes articles needing translation from French Wikipedia
French Flanders